Shoppers World is a retail chain of discount department stores headquartered in New York. It has approximately 40 locations, mostly in the eastern United States. It is operated by the SW Group, controlled by the Dushey family.

History
Shoppers World traces its founding to the 1930s, when Sam Dushey Sr. founded "The Mart" in Baltimore, Maryland. In the 1950s, Dushey opened the Pitkin Bargain Center on Pitkin Avenue in Brooklyn, New York. Dushey opened the first Shoppers World store in Elizabeth, New Jersey, in 1972. 

In 2015, CEO Sam Dushey went undercover in Shoppers World stores for an episode of the TV show Undercover Boss.

References

External links
 Official website

Discount stores of the United States
1972 establishments in New York City
Retail companies established in 1972
Companies based in New York City